Ngao, Thailand may refer to:

 Ngao District, Lampang Province, Thailand
 Ngao, Thoeng, a village and subdistrict of Thoeng District, Chiang Rai Province, Thailand
Ngao River, a river in Northern Thailand, tributary of the Yom River
Ngao River (Yuam), a river in Northern Thailand, tributary of the Yuam River